Sechelt Indian Government District is a municipality in the Sunshine Coast region of southwest British Columbia, Canada. It was incorporated on March 17, 1988. The district consists of 33 separate pieces of land, of which 32 are located within the Sunshine Coast Regional District and the remaining piece located within the Powell River Regional District.

Demographics 

See also 
List of communities in British Columbia
List of Indian reserves in British Columbia
List of municipalities in British Columbia

External links

References 

Indian government districts in British Columbia
Shishalh
Former Indian reserves in British Columbia
Populated places in the Sunshine Coast Regional District